Bevil may refer to:

People with the given name
Bevil Conway (born 1974), neuroscientist and artist
Barney Glover AO FTSE FRSN (|Bevil Milton Glover; born 1958), Australian Professor, mathematician, and university Vice Chancellor
Bevil Granville (died 1706), English soldier, governor of Pendennis Castle in Cornwall, governor of Barbados
Bevil Grenville (1594–1643), lord of the manors of Bideford in Devon and of Stowe in Cornwall, Royalist commander in the Civil War
Bevil Higgons (1670–1735), English historian and poet
Bevil Mabey (1916–2010), English businessman and inventor
Bevil Quiller-Couch MC, decorated British Army Officer
Guilford Bevil Reed, OBE FRSC (1887–1955), Canadian medical researcher
Bevil Rudd (1894–1948), South African Olympic athlete
Bevil Skelton (1641–1696), British foreign envoy and diplomat
William Bevil Thomas (1757–1825), Canadian merchant, land developer and sea captain notable
Bevil Wooding, Technologist and Development Strategist from Trinidad and Tobago
John Hugh Bevil Acland, KCB, CBE, DL (1928–2006), senior British Army officer
Peter Bevil Edward Acland, OBE, MC, TD, DL, JP, OStJ (1902–1993), British soldier

People with the surname
Brian Bevil (born 1971), former Major League Baseball pitcher
Lou Bevil (1922–1973), professional baseball player
Rob Bevil
(1968- present)
related term beviled to make someone very drunk

See also
Sir Bevil Grenville's Monument, a monument in Bath, Somerset, England
Bevil Oaks, Texas, a city in Jefferson County, Texas, United States
Belville (disambiguation)
Benville (disambiguation)
Berville (disambiguation)